Fish Hoek railway station is a railway station in Fish Hoek, Cape Town, South Africa. The station opened on 1 December 1890 as the first station on the extension from Kalk Bay to Simon's Town, the present-day terminus. It was electrified in 1928. Fish Hoek is served by Southern Line services operated by Metrorail.

Due to the line converging to single-track south of Fish Hoek, many trains terminate at the station.

References

External links 

Railway stations opened in 1890
1890 establishments in the Cape Colony